Martin Philip Pakula (born 7 January 1969) is a former Australian politician. He has been a Labor Party member of the Parliament of Victoria since 2006: in the Legislative Council for Western Metropolitan Region from 2006 to 2010, and then in the Legislative Assembly for Lyndhurst (2013–2014) and Keysborough (2014–2022).

Pakula has served as a minister in the First Andrews Ministry and Second Andrews Ministry. Most recently until June 2022, Pakula was the Minister for Industry Support and Recovery, Minister for Trade, Minister for Business Precincts from June 2020, the Minister for Tourism, Sport & Major Events from November 2018, and the Minister for Racing from December 2014. He previously served as the Minister for Jobs, Innovation & Trade (2018–2020), Attorney-General (2014–2018). He also served as Minister for Industrial Relations (2008–2010), Minister for Industry and Trade (2008–2010) and Minister for Public Transport (2010) in the Brumby Ministry.

Early life
Pakula was born in Melbourne in 1969, the son of immigrants from Poland who were deported during World War II to Uzbekistan. Pakula's mother, a school teacher, arrived in Australia as a 6 year old with no knowledge of English, while his father, a lawyer, spoke no English at home. He attended Ormond Primary School and then Haileybury.  Following this, he was accepted to study economics and law at Monash University.  During his time at Monash he became a leading member of Victorian Young Labor, joining the Labor Party in 1987.  He completed his Bachelor of Economics in 1989 and an Honours Degree in Law in 1991.  In his final year, he won the Industrial Relations Law prize.

Professional career
After graduating from university, Pakula began work at Macpherson and Kelley Solicitors. In 1993, he became an Industrial Officer at the National Union of Workers. He went on to become State Secretary and National Vice President. 

In 2005, Pakula unsuccessfully challenged Simon Crean in the ALP preselection for the seat of Hotham. Pakula was then preselected for ALP's third spot for the Western Metropolitan Region and was elected at the 2006 Victorian state election. Following the election, he was appointed Parliamentary Secretary for Roads and Ports under Tim Pallas. 

After the resignation of Minister Theo Theophanous in December 2008, Pakula was appointed Minister for Industry and Trade and Minister for Industrial Relations. In January 2010, he replaced Lynne Kosky as Minister for Public Transport following her resignation.

On 18 March 2013 he was endorsed as the Labor candidate for the Lyndhurst by-election held on 27 April, caused by the February 2013 resignation of shadow treasurer Tim Holding. Pakula resigned from the Legislative Council on 26 March 2013 to contest Lyndhurst and was successful in retaining the seat for Labor.

On 4 December 2014 he was sworn in as the Victorian Attorney-General, and was replaced by Jill Hennessy following the 2018 Victorian state election. He continued to be a minister in a number of portfolios, with the racing portfolio being held the longest since 2014.

In June 2022, Pakula announced he would retire at the November state election. He stepped down from his ministerial roles on 27 June 2022.

Personal life
Pakula is married with two children and is a supporter of the Carlton Football Club. He lives in Black Rock. Pakula is Jewish.

References

External links
 Parliamentary profile
 Martin Pakula in Victorian Hansard
 
 Parliamentary voting record of Martin Pakula at Victorian Parliament Tracker

1969 births
Living people
People educated at Haileybury (Melbourne)
Australian Labor Party members of the Parliament of Victoria
Labor Right politicians
Politicians from Melbourne
Australian people of Uzbekistani descent
Australian people of Polish descent
Members of the Victorian Legislative Assembly
Members of the Victorian Legislative Council
Monash Law School alumni
Australian Jews
21st-century Australian politicians
People from Black Rock, Victoria